This is an incomplete list of notable Italian lawyers:

A
Alberico Gentili
Silvestro Aldobrandini
Giorgio Ambrosoli

B
Antonio Barbieri
Olinto Barsanti
Tina Lagostena Bassi
Lelio Basso
Mario Berlinguer
Enzo Bianco
Ivanoe Bonomi
Mario Borghezio
Giovanni Braschi

C
 Sergio Campana (footballer)
 Ferdinando Carabba Tettamanti
 Alberto Caramella
Giuseppe Lorenzo Maria Casaregi
 Roberto Cassinelli
 Michele Cianciulli

D
 Enrico De Nicola
 Antonio Di Pietro
 Domenico Donna

F
 Dario Franceschini

G
 Luigi Gasparotto
 Niccolò Ghedini
 Pier Michele Giagaraccio
 Franzo Grande Stevens
 Guglielmo Gulotta

I
 Mario Ielpo

L
 Domenico Lanza

M

O
 Angelo Oliviero Olivetti
 Leoluca Orlando

P
 Carlo Palermo
Giuseppe Palmisano
 Luca Pancalli
 Giuseppe Paratore
 Alfonso Pecoraro Scanio
 Carmine Pecorelli
 Camillo Porzio
 Cesare Previti
 Giuseppe Prisco

R
Guido Raimondi
 Attilio Ruffini

S
 Giuseppe Saracco
 Mario Scaramella
 Francesco Spiera

T
Filippo Turati

V
 Lelio Vittorio Valobra
 Gustavo Venturi
 Bruno Villabruna
 Bruno Visentini

 
Lawyers
Italy